Kazem (also spelled Kadhem, Kadhim, Kazim, Qazim or Cathum; written in , in Persian: کاظِم) means "tolerant", "forgiving", and "having patience" is an Arabic male given name. Although the pronunciation of the Arabic letter Ẓāʾ is often closer to a strong "d" sound, given the prevalence of the name in Greater Iran, and subsequent cultural exchanges between Persia and  Indian Subcontinent, Central Asia and Anatolia, the letter is commonly pronounced as Z. Thus the name's pronunciation differs based on location and consequently in its transcription. The most notable person to be awarded with this epithet was Musa-Al-Kadhim, the seventh Shia Imam, who is revered by both Sunnis and Sufis too.

Given name
 Kâzım Özalp (1880–1968), Turkish military officer
 Qazim Koculi (1887–1943), Albanian politician
 Kâzım Orbay (1887–1964), Turkish general and senator
 Qazim Dervishi (1908–1994), Albanian referee
 Kazim Ergin (1915–2002), Turkish geophysicist
 Kazim al-Samawi (1925 – 2010) Iraqi poet and journalist
 Kazem Rajavi (1934–1990), Iranian politician
 Kazım Ayvaz (1938–2020), Turkish sport wrestler
 Kazem al-Haeri (born 1938), Iraqi-Iranian Cleric
 Kadim Al Sahir (born 1957), Iraqi Singer
 Kazem Akhavan, Iranian diplomat
 Kazim Ali (born 1971), American poet
 Kazem Borjlou (born 1980), Iranian footballer
Kazem Nourmofidi (born 1940), Iranian Cleric
Kazem Seddiqi (born 1951), Iranian Cleric
 Kadhem Sharif (born 1952), Iraqi wrestler and weightlifter
 Kazem Oraee (born 1954), Iranian Engineer
 Kazem Jalali (bona 1967),Iranian Politician
 (born 1969), Iranian Cleric & War Veteran
Seyed Kazem Seyed Bagheri (born 1971), Iranian Cleric & Politcal Scientist

Surname
 Raza Kazim (born 1930), Pakistani politician 
 Safinaz Kazem (born 1937), Egyptian author
 Juggan Kazim (born 1980), Pakistani model
 Wissam Kadhim (born 1986), Iraqi footballer

See also
 Musa al-Kadhim

References

Arabic-language surnames
Arabic masculine given names
Iranian masculine given names
Turkish masculine given names